Grigori Konstantinovich Babayan (2 April 1980) is a Kazakh football manager and a former player of Armenian descent, who is currently Head Coach of Astana.

Career

Club
During his senior career he played for Kairat and Alma-Ata.

Managerial

In 2012, Babayan joined FC Astana as a coach, serving as caretaker manager on several occasions. On 14 December 2019, Babayan was appointed as manager of FC Tobol.

On 17 June 2021, Babayan was appointed by CSKA Moscow as a member of their coaching staff. On 15 June 2022, he left CSKA by mutual consent.

On 13 September 2022, Babayan was appointed as Head Coach of Astana following the departure of Srđan Blagojević.

Managerial statistics

References

Living people
1980 births
Kazakhstani footballers
Association football midfielders
Kazakhstani people of Armenian descent
FC Astana managers
FC Kairat players
Kazakhstani football managers